Hasan Siraj Suja is a Bangladeshi politician and lawyer. He is a politician of Jatiya Party. He is an Advisor to the chair of the Central Committee of Jatiya Party. He was a Joint Secretary General in the Central Committee of Jatiya Party. Besides, he is working as a vice president of Jatiyo Ainjibi Federation, lawyer wing of Jatiya Party.

References

Living people
21st-century Bangladeshi lawyers
Jatiya Party politicians
People from Magura District
Year of birth missing (living people)